Carl Ludwig Noah Bantzer (6 August 1857, Ziegenhain – 19 December 1941, Marburg) was a painter, professor and art critic; associated with the .

Biography 
He was born to Heinrich Bantzer (1809–1863), a veterinarian. After his father's death, his mother moved the family to Marburg, where he attended the prestigious Gymnasium Philippinum. Later, he studied at the Academy of Arts, Berlin. In 1884 and 1885 he was in Schwalm, where he worked with the painter , from Dresden. He also spent time in Treysa, painting portraits of local notables and people in traditional costume.

His first wife, Claire, died in 1887, giving birth to their son Arnold. He would return there every summer for many years. In 1890, he stayed in Paris for several months. The following year, he was in Dresden.

Having failed to find any suitable models for his work, he returned to Willingshausen. In 1896, he had an old wooden church disassembled and reconstructed in Marburg, to use as a studio. That same year, he was appointed a Professor at the Dresden Academy of Fine Arts.

He remarried in 1899, to Helene Francis Darbishire (1874–1953). This marriage produced five children, including , an illustrator of children's books who married the cartoonist known as E. O. Plauen, and Carl Francis Bantzer (1900-1945), who also became a painter. Carl Francis, in turn, was the father of the actor, Christoph Bantzer, and the musician, Claus Bantzer.

From 1903, he was a member of the Deutscher Künstlerbund In 1904, he participated in their first join exhibition with the Munich Secession at the Staatliche Antikensammlungen. In 1909, Kurt Schwitters became one of his students.

In 1918, he was appointed Director of the Kunsthochschule Kassel, a position he held until 1923. He was awarded the Goethe-Medaille für Kunst und Wissenschaft in 1937. At that time, the awards were personally chosen by Hitler Two years later, he was a candidate for the German National Prize for Art and Science. He paid his last visit to Willingshausen just before his death, in 1941.

A school in Ziegenhain bears his name.

References

Further reading
 
 "Carl Bantzer, der dt. Maler". In: Velhagen & Klasings Monatshefte #40, 1925/1926.
 Andreas Bantzer: Carl Bantzer, ein Leben in Briefen. Vereinigung Malerstübchen Willingshausen, 1998, .
 Hellmuth Heinz: Carl Bantzer (Maler und Werk). Verlag der Kunst, Dresden 1981.

External links 

 More works by Bantzer @ ArtNet
 
 

1857 births
1941 deaths
19th-century German painters
19th-century German male artists
German genre painters
German landscape painters
Academic staff of the Dresden Academy of Fine Arts
People from Schwalmstadt
20th-century German painters
20th-century German male artists